Elections to Eastleigh Council were held on 3 May 2012.  15 out of 44 council seats were up for election and the Liberal Democrat party kept overall control of the council.

After the election, the composition of the council was
Liberal Democrat 40
Conservative 4

Election result

Ward results

External links
 

2012 English local elections
2012
2010s in Hampshire